This is the discography of Emilie Autumn.

Albums

Studio albums

Instrumental albums
On a Day... (1997)
Laced / Unlaced (2007)

Rarities albums
A Bit o' This & That (2007)

Extended plays
By the Sword (2001)
Chambermaid (2001)
Opheliac EP (2006)
Liar / Dead Is the New Alive (2006)
4 o'Clock (2008)
Girls Just Wanna Have Fun & Bohemian Rhapsody (2008)

Singles
Prick! Goes the Scorpion's Tale (on The Devil's Carnival soundtrack)
Fight Like a Girl (2012)
The Passenger (Iggy Pop cover, 2021)
 We Have Instructions (2022) 
 Who's A Little Leach? (2022)
 Portraits (2022)

Music videos
"Fight Like a Girl" (2013)

Guest contributions
Backing vocals and violin on the album America's Sweetheart (2003) by Courtney Love
Backing vocals and violin on the album TheFutureEmbrace (2005) by Billy Corgan
Song "Organ Grinder" on the European edition of the Saw III soundtrack (2006)
Violin on the album The Dethalbum (2007) by Dethklok
Remix version of "Dead Is the New Alive" on the international version of the Saw IV soundtrack (2007)
Vocals and violin on the song "The Gates of Eternity" from the album All Mine Enemys Whispers (2008) by Attrition
Violin on the track "UR A WMN NOW" on OTEP's fourth album, Smash the Control Machine (2009)
Vocals and violin on the song "Dry" by Die Warzau (2009)
Vocals featured on the soundtrack for The Devil's Carnival as The Painted Doll, and additional violin (2012)
Vocals featured on the soundtrack for Alleluia! The Devil's Carnival as The Painted Doll (2015)

References

External links

Discography
Autumn, Emilie